Pringle Falls is a series of rapids or drops on the upper Deschutes River in the U.S. state of Oregon. The next  is class III (intermediate] ending in a class IV (advanced) drop. Soggy Sneakers: A Paddler's Guide to Oregon's Rivers says, "Only expert kayakers should consider this drop, and only after scouting. It is definitely not a rapids for open canoes."

The survey notes that the falls cannot be seen from nearby roadways or other public property.

Most boaters portage  around the falls, taking out of the river at Wyeth Campground and putting back in below the falls at Pringle Falls Campground. Shorter portages are not feasible because the land on both sides of the rapids is private. The two campgrounds, one upstream and one downstream of the private land, are within the Deschutes National Forest.

Name
The falls were named for O. M. Pringle, who bought  of government land here in 1902 under provisions of the Timber and Stone Act. The falls were also known as the Fish Trap, a reference to its use by Native Americans, who caught fish by the gills as they swam upriver through shallow channels. A post office named Pringlefalls operated from 1916 to 1918.

References

Waterfalls of Deschutes County, Oregon
Deschutes National Forest
Waterfalls of Oregon